Lindenhurst is a station on the Babylon Branch of the Long Island Rail Road. It is officially located at Wellwood Avenue (Suffolk CR 3) and East Hoffman Avenue (Suffolk CR 12) in Lindenhurst, New York.

History
Lindenhurst station is typical of the elevated Babylon Branch stations that were rebuilt during the mid-to-late 20th Century. It was originally built by the South Side Railroad of Long Island on October 28, 1867, as "Wellwood" It was renamed "Breslau" in 1870, after developers Thomas Welwood and Charles S. Schleier renamed the community after their native Breslau in German Empire, then was renamed "Lindenhurst" in 1891. The station burned down suspiciously on January 22, 1901. The second station was built in 1902. This station was replaced with a temporary station with high-level platforms on October 25, 1968, when construction of the current elevated station was started. The current elevated station was opened on August 7, 1973, and was renovated in the early 2000s, along with much of the rest of the Babylon line. The 1902 station was moved to a private location and restored as a museum in 1971.

Station layout
The station has one 10-car-long high-level island platform between the two tracks.

References

External links 

Old Lindenhurst Station (Arrt's Arrchives)
Unofficial LIRR History Website
March 2000 and May 2007 Photos
Close-Up of Keystone Logo and Platforms
LIRR Station History
 Travis Street entrance from Google Maps Street View
 Station House from Google Maps Street View
 East entrance from Google Maps Street View

Long Island Rail Road stations in Suffolk County, New York
Railway stations in the United States opened in 1867
1867 establishments in New York (state)